Helge Rønning (born 1 September 1943) is a Norwegian literary researcher. He was born in Oslo. He was editor of the magazine Samtiden from 1979 to 1988, and was appointed professor at the University of Oslo from 1987. Among his research interests is African literature, Henrik Ibsen and the role of television.

References

1943 births
Living people
Academic staff of the University of Oslo
Norwegian magazine editors
Henrik Ibsen researchers